Peisander was a Spartan admiral during the Corinthian War. In 395 BC, he was placed in command of the Spartan fleet in the Aegean by his brother-in-law, the king Agesilaus II. Peisander was a relatively inexperienced general, and in its very first action his Spartan fleet was decisively defeated at the Battle of Cnidus. Peisander died fighting aboard his ship.

References
Fine, John V.A. The Ancient Greeks: A critical history (Harvard University Press, 1983). 

Ancient Spartan admirals
4th-century BC Spartans
Ancient Greeks killed in battle
394 BC deaths
Spartans of the Corinthian War
Year of birth unknown